Jeremy Smith (born 31 October 1973) is a former Australian rules footballer who played with Carlton in the Australian Football League (AFL).

Notes

External links

Jeremy Smith's profile at Blueseum

1973 births
Carlton Football Club players
Sandy Bay Football Club players
Australian rules footballers from Tasmania
Living people